Casshan: Robot Hunter, known in Japan as  or simply , is an original video animation (OVA) series that was directed by Hiroyuki Fukushima, produced and animated by Tatsunoko Production and Artmic. The OVA was later adapted into an English-language dubbed film that was directed by Carl Macek. This series is based on Tatsunoko Productions' 1973 anime series Neo-Human Casshern.

Premise
Enslaved by an army of rebellious super-robots originally designed to help civilization avert a complete ecological cataclysm, mankind's only hope is Casshan, a legendary hero who wages a solitary war to defeat the Neoroids and restore the Earth to its rightful order. Casshan's father is the scientist who engineered the race of super androids now threatening to destroy all of mankind. On a crusade to save humankind and clear his father's name, Casshan sacrifices his own humanity in order to attain the powers he needs. Haunted by the memories of his murdered mother and forced to deal with a super robot that has absorbed the consciousness of his father, Casshan must put aside his own emotions and fight to preserve the survival of the human race.

Release

Casshan: Robot Hunter was originally released as a four-volume OVA series in Japan between August 21, 1993 and February 21, 1994. The American publisher Harmony Gold USA edited the four episodes into a single feature film for its English-language debut in 1995. In 2003, ADV Films re-released the four-episode series on DVD. The title sequence for the OVA translates the katakana  "キャシャーン" as "Casshan". This was repeated in the American adaptation by Harmony Gold.

Cast

Japanese Cast
Takeshi Kusao as Tetsuya Azuma / Casshan
Yumi Touma as Luna Kozuki
Hirohiko Kakegawa as Admiral Montgomery Dr. Lester
Ikuya Sawaki as Narrator
Issei Futamata as Akbone
Isshin Chiba as Operator
Junichi Sugawara as Barashin
Juurouta Kosugi as Commander Tork
Keaton Yamada as Dr. Kotaro Azuma
Kenichi Ogata as Elder Asari
Kenji Utsumi as Buraiking Boss (Black King Boss in the dub)
Masaki Aizawa as Information Robot
Nobuo Tobita as Nyman
Sanae Takagi as Midori Azuma
Toshiyuki Morikawa as Pilot
Wataru Takagi as Executive Officer
Yuri Amano as Sagria

English Cast
 Alexandra Kenworthy as Narrator
 Ardwight Chamberlain
 Catherine Battistone as Neoroid Commander
 Eddie Frierson
 Edie Mirman as Luna Kozuki
 Jeff Winkless as Black King / Android BK-1
 Kerrigan Mahan
 Kirk Thornton as unnamed prisoner who betrays Luna in the first episode.
 Melanie MacQueen
 Michael Forest as Adm. Rudolph
 Michael McConnohie
 Michael Reynolds
 Michael Sorich
 Richard Allen
 Richard Cansino
 Simon Prescott
 Stephen Apostolina
 Steve Bulen as Casshan / Tetsuya Azuma
 Steve Kramer as Professor Hannibal

Reception
Helen McCarthy praised the work of top designer Yasuomi Umetsu and says that anime "holds your attention with interesting concept and designs".

References

External links
 
 

1993 anime OVAs
1995 anime films
ADV Films
Casshern
Discotek Media
Fictional cyborgs
Science fiction anime and manga
Superheroes in anime and manga
Shunsuke Kikuchi
Tatsunoko Production

it:Kyashan